Inspector Vicki King (born 1960) is a pioneering threat safety scientist in the healthcare sector.  She is the leader of the Threat Assessment Unit at the University of Texas at Houston Police Department, which is a component of the University of Texas System.

Early life and education
Born in Houston to a long-standing law enforcement family, King grew up aspiring to become a police officer.  When she joined the Houston Police Department in 1985, women in patrol and investigations were still rare. In 2001, King earned a Bachelor of Science in Criminal Justice and in 2006 a Master's of Science in the same discipline from the University of Houston. She has had additional formal training through the Police Executive Research Forum's Senior Management Institute for Police at Boston University and Law Enforcement Management Institute Training (LEMIT) for new police chiefs at Sam Houston State University.

Career
King served 27 years with the Houston Police Department, rising to the rank of Assistant Chief and earning a master's degree in Criminal Justice. As Chief of Detectives, Tactical Support Commander, and Director of Forensic Services, she oversaw some of HPD's highest-profile cases, including serial homicides, corruption, domestic violence, sexual assaults, and gangland slayings. King created the Gang Murder Squad within the Houston Police Department, which resulted in homicide clearance rates improving from 62% in 2005 to 94% in 2008. She left the Houston Police Department to serve as an emissary to the Saudi Royal family. She has been an adjunct professor for the University of Houston system and has been the Chief of Police for the City of La Marque, Texas, working with agencies of the U.S. Department of Homeland Security, DEA and the FBI.

Threat safety research and development
King is one of the pioneers Threat Safety Science for the healthcare industry sector along with her research colleagues at MD Anderson Cancer Center, clinical experts at the Texas Medical Center, and national threat management and patient safety experts. The research and development work is focused on prevention, preparedness, protection, and performance improvement related to manmade and natural threats using a multidisciplinary team approach. As a leader of the Threat Management Unit at the MD Anderson Cancer Center, she and her colleagues are working on evidence based solutions that can deescalate high threat situations that prevent harm to caregivers, patients, and law enforcement staff.

Certifications
 LEMIT Chief of Police Certification
 FBI Organized Crime Task Force
 TCOLE Crisis Intervention Officer
 TCOLE Crime Prevention Specialist
 TCOLE Mental Health Officer
 TCOLE Instructor's License
 TCOLE Master Peace Officer
 Top Secret Clearance – Federal Bureau of Investigation
 National Security Clearance – Federal Bureau of Investigation
 Master Peace Officer, Texas Commission on Law Enforcement (TCOLE)
 Police Instructor –State of Texas
 Academic Recognition Award - State of Texas

Professional affiliations
 International Association of Chiefs of Police
 International Association of Campus Law Enforcement Administrators
 Police Executive Research Forum
 Association of Threat Assessment Professionals
 TEEN and Police Service Academy (TAPS) – Board Member

Honors and awards
 2011 Houston Mayor's Proclamation of Vicki King Day
 2011 HPD Lifetime Achievement Award Houston Police Foundation Lifetime Member
 2011 Rebuilding Houston (5 Years of Volunteer Service) 
 2007 Debakey Volunteer Appreciation 
 2007 NASA Group Achievement Unit Citation (4 Awards)
 1997 HPD Meritorious Service 
 1996 Houston Mayor's Commendation 
 1996 Officer of the Year – Texas Women in Law Enforcement

References

1960 births
Living people
American women police officers
People from Houston
Texas Medical Center
21st-century American women